

General classification

References

Giro di Lombardia
1942 in road cycling
1942 in Italian sport